The Zimbabwe Industrial Index is a stock index derived from the values of industrial stocks on the Zimbabwe Stock Exchange. The Zimbabwe Mining Index is a separate stock index, composed of mining companies.

Index listing
March 2007

Zimbabwe Mining Index
As of March 2007 the Zimbabwe Mining Index had 5 company listings.

Index Listings

External links
Dawn Properties Limited Annual report 2010
OK Zimbabwe Limited Annual Report 2010
Zimbabwe Industrial Index and Zimbabwe Mining Index, at the Zimbabwe Stock Exchange official site

African stock market indices
Economy of Zimbabwe